Diophila is a genus of moths in the family Autostichidae. It was previously placed in the family Cosmopterigidae.

Species
Diophila bathrota (Meyrick, 1911)
Diophila claricoma Meyrick, 1937

References
Natural History Museum Lepidoptera genus database

Autostichinae